Rising River Ranch is a  property situated northeast of Doyles Corner, west of Rising River Lake, near Cassel, between Fall River Mills and Burney, in Shasta County, California. Rising River Ranch is notable for its owners. Actor Bing Crosby purchased the ranch in 1958. The Bing Crosby Estate sold it at auction, in  1978, to actor/director Clint Eastwood. The property has been used in movie and TV productions.

References 

Buildings and structures in Shasta County, California
Ranches in California